The 2013–2014 session was a session of the California State Legislature. The session first convened on December 3, 2012, and adjourned sine die on November 30, 2014.

Major events

Vacancies and special elections 
 August 31, 2012: Republican state senator Doug LaMalfa (4th–Richvale) resigned to run for Congress.
 January 2, 2013: Democratic state senators Gloria Negrete McLeod (32nd–Chino) and Juan Vargas (40th–San Diego) resigned to take their seats in Congress.
 January 10, 2013: Former Republican assemblyman Jim Nielsen of Gerber is sworn into office after winning the January 8 special election for the 4th State Senate district to replace LaMalfa.
 February 22, 2013: Democratic state senator Michael Rubio (32nd–Shafter) resigned to become government relations manager for Chevron Corporation.
 March 21, 2013: Democratic assemblyman Ben Hueso (80th–San Diego) is sworn into office after winning the March 12 special election for the 40th State Senate district to replace Vargas.
 May 20, 2013: Democratic assemblywoman Norma Torres (52nd–Pomona) is sworn into office after winning the May 14 special election for the 32nd State Senate district to replace Negrete McLeod.
 May 28, 2013: Democrat Lorena Gonzalez of San Diego is sworn into office after winning the May 21 special election for the 80th State Assembly district to replace Hueso.
 June 30, 2013: Democratic state senator Curren Price (26th–Los Angeles) and Democratic assemblyman Bob Blumenfield (45th–Woodland Hills) resigned to take up their seats on the Los Angeles City Council.
 August 10, 2013: Republican Andy Vidak of Hanford is sworn into office after winning the July 23 special election for the 16th State Senate district to replace Rubio.
 September 26, 2013: Democratic assemblywoman Holly Mitchell (54th–Los Angeles) is sworn into office after winning the September 17 special election for the 26th State Senate district to replace Price.
 October 11, 2013: Democrat Freddie Rodriguez of Pomona is sworn into office after winning the September 24 special election for the 52nd State Assembly district to replace Torres.
 December 1, 2013: Republican state senator Bill Emmerson (23rd–Hemet) resigned for personal reasons.
 December 5, 2013: Democrat Sebastian Ridley-Thomas of Los Angeles is sworn into office after winning the December 3 special election for the 54th State Assembly district to replace Mitchell.
 January 6, 2014: Democrat Matt Dababneh of Encino is sworn into office after winning the November 19 special election for the 45th State Assembly district to replace Blumenfield.
 March 28, 2014: Democratic state senators Ron Calderon (30th–Montebello), Rod Wright (35th–Inglewood), and Leland Yee (8th–San Francisco) are suspended from service.
 April 3, 2014: Republican assemblyman Mike Morrell (40th–Rancho Cucamonga) is sworn into office after winning the March 25 special election for the 23rd State Senate district to replace Emmerson.
 September 22, 2014: Democratic state senator Rod Wright (35th–Inglewood) resigned to serve a jail sentence after conviction for perjury and voter fraud.

Leadership changes 
 May 12, 2014: Democratic assemblywoman Toni Atkins (78th–San Diego) replaces assemblyman John Pérez (53rd–Los Angeles) as Speaker of the Assembly, as Pérez is termed out at the end of the session.
 October 15, 2014: Democratic state senator Kevin de León (22nd–Los Angeles) replaces state senator Darrell Steinberg (6th–Sacramento) as President pro tempore of the State Senate, as Steinberg is termed out at the end of the session.

Party changes

Senate

Officers 

The Secretary, the Sergeant-at-Arms, and the Chaplain are not members of the Legislature.

Members 
Note that odd-numbered districts are based on the new maps created in 2011 by the California Citizens Redistricting Commission, while even-numbered districts are based on the old maps created in 2001 by the state legislature. Odd districts can overlap with even districts or leave gaps.

Assembly

Officers 

The Chief Clerk, the Sergeant-at-Arms, and the Chaplain are not members of the Legislature.

Members

See also
 List of California state legislatures

References

External links 
 California State Senate
 California State Assembly

2013-2014
2013 in California
2014 in California
2013 U.S. legislative sessions
2014 U.S. legislative sessions